The Four Seasons Story  is a two-record compilation of The Four Seasons's biggest hit singles from 1962 to 1970. It was released in 1975 on the Private Stock label. It quickly became a gold record, selling over one million copies before the RIAA started awarding platinum records for million-selling albums (1976).

Track listing (Length/Production Year/Chart Position)
Side 1
"Sherry" (Bob Gaudio) – 2:30 (1962 / #1)
"Big Girls Don’t Cry" (Bob Crewe/Bob Gaudio) – 2:25 (1962 / #1)
"Walk Like a Man" (Bob Crewe/Bob Gaudio) – 2:21 (1963 / #1)
"Stay" (Maurice Williams) – 1:58 (1963 / #16)
"Marlena" (Bob Gaudio) – 2:32 (1963 / #36)
"Don’t Think Twice" (Bob Dylan) – 2:59 (1966 / #12)
"Candy Girl" (Larry Santos) – 2:40 (1963 / #3)

Side 2
"Dawn" (Bob Gaudio/Sandy Linzer) – 2:11 (1964 / #3)
"C'mon Marianne" (L. Russell Brown/Raymond Bloodworth) - 2:23 (1967 / #9)
"Opus 17 (Don't You Worry 'bout Me)" (Denny Randell/Sandy Linzer) – 2:33 (1966 / #13)
"Workin’ My Way Back to You" (Denny Randell/Sandy Linzer) – 2:51 (1965 / #9)
"Let’s Hang On" [Bob Crewe/Denny Randell/Sandy Linzer) – 3:09 (1965 / #3)
"Ronnie" (Bob Crewe/Bob Gaudio) – 2:25 (1964 / #6)
"Bye, Bye, Baby (Baby Goodbye)" (Bob Crewe/Bob Gaudio) – 2:32 (1964 / #12)

Side 3
"Rag Doll" (Bob Crewe/Bob Gaudio) – 3:00 (1964 / #1)
"Beggin'" (Bob Gaudio/Peggy Farina)  - 3:48 (1967 / #16)
"Silence Is Golden" (Bob Crewe/Bob Gaudio) – 3:03 (1964)
"I've Got You Under My Skin" (Cole Porter) – 3:37 (1966 / #9)
"Save It for Me" (Bob Crewe/Bob Gaudio) – 2:37 (1964 / #10)
"Big Man in Town" (Bob Gaudio) – 2:47 (1965 / #20)
"Will You Still Love Me (Tomorrow)" (Gerry Goffin/Carole King) – 2:32 (1968 / #24)

Side 4
"And That Reminds Me" (Al Stillman/Camillo Bargoni) – 3:31 (1969 / #45)
"Electric Stories" (Mike Petrillo/Sandy Linzer) – 3:05 (1968 / #61)
"Watch the Flowers Grow" (L. Russell Brown/Raymond Bloodworth) – 3:33 (1967 / #30)
"Tell It to the Rain" (Mike Petrillo/Chubby Cifelli) – 2:30 (1966 / #10)
"Ain't That a Shame" (Fats Domino/Dave Bartholomew) – 2:37 (1963 / #22)
"Toy Soldier" (Bob Crewe/Bob Gaudio) – 2:37 (1965 / #64)
"Alone" (Selma Craft/Morty Craft) – 2:32 (1964 / #28)

The production year for track 1 on side 4 was given as 1976 on the record label but was #45 in the charts in 1969.

Production
Arrangements and adaptions: Charles Callelo, Nick Massi, Denny Randell and Bob Gaudio
Producer: Bob Crewe
Album photography: Dean Cade
Album design and illustration: Vigon, Nahas, Vigon

Certifications

References

1975 compilation albums